GSSE may refer to:
 Games of the Small States of Europe, a sports competition 
 Generic Substation State Events in electrical power distribution 
 General Services Support Estimate, a measure of agricultural subsidies
 Group for a Switzerland Without an Army, campaign against Swiss militarisation